Kobayashi Maru is a training exercise in the fictional Star Trek universe.

Kobayashi Maru may also refer to:

 "Kobayashi Maru", the first fourth season episode of the American television series Star Trek: Discovery
 The Kobayashi Maru (Star Trek novel), a 1989 Star Trek science fiction novel by Julia Ecklar

See also

 "Kobayashi", a first-season episode of the American animated television series Star Trek: Prodigy
 Kobayashi (disambiguation)
 Maru (disambiguation)
 Kobyashi Naru, 1987 adventure video game